Thomas Rocher (17 June 1930 – 9 June 2018) was an Australian cricketer. He played two first-class matches for Tasmania between 1959 and 1960.

See also
 List of Tasmanian representative cricketers

References

External links
 

1930 births
2018 deaths
Australian cricketers
Tasmania cricketers
Cricketers from Tasmania